Malihabad is a town and nagar panchayat in the Lucknow district of Uttar Pradesh, India. It is also the seat of a tehsil and a community development block of the same name. As of 2011, its population was 17,818, in 3,032 households. Malihabad is the largest of Uttar Pradesh's 14 designated mango belts and accounted for 12.5% of all mango production in the state in 2013. Hundreds of mango varieties are grown here, including the Chausa, Langda, Safeda, and most famously the Dasheri, the "king of mangoes", of which it is one of India's main producers and exporters. Mango grower and Padma Shri recipient Kaleem Ullah Khan has contributed to the popularization of Malihabad's mango industry.

Malihabad is also a centre of chikan embroidery work.

Malihabad has two slum areas called Joshin Tola (pop. 475) and Basti Dhanwant Rai (pop. 589), with 5.97% of the town's population living in them.

Neighbouring places include Garhi Sanjar Khan to the west and Bakhtiyarnagar to the south.

Geography
It has an average elevation of 128 metres (419 feet).The main areas in Malihabad are Mirzaganj, Syedwara, Chaudrana and Kewalhar. And Malihabad major people belong to the rural area and there are most probably 187 village and 67 gram panchayat also included under the tahsheel of Malihabad.

History 
According to some scholars, Malihabad's name came from Shaikh Malih, a relative of Shaikh Abdul Rahim, settled during the time of Akbar. Malihabad may have come under Muslim rule as early as the reign of Muhammad Bakhtiyar Khilji, who invaded Awadh in 1202.

Malihabad was historically the seat of a pargana, as mentioned in the Ain-i-Akbari. At the time of Shajhan it was colonized by Ammanzai Pathans, who became the primary landowners.  During the reign of Safdarjung, the Pathan landlords Yaar beg Khan Afridi, Baaz khan afridi, Karam khan afridi etc granted part of Malihabad, known as Kawalhar. In 1257H Nawab Faqir Muhammad khan Goya Grandson of Yaar beg khan afridi  become the commander-in-chief in the army of Ghazi-ud-Din Haidar Shah. He became enamored with Malihabad and requested permission from the Nawab to grow mangoes here, thus establishing the first mango plantation in Malihabad  and he build mahals, havelis, serai, mosque and bazaar in Mirzaganj (town in Malihabad). His great-grandson was the famous poet Josh Malihabadi.

Demographics 

 India census, Malihabad had a population of 15,806. Males constitute 53% of the population and females 47%. Malihabad has an average literacy rate of 52%, lower than the national average of 59.5%: male literacy is 59%, and female literacy is 45%.  In Malihabad, 16% of the population is under 6 years of age.

Economics
Dasheri mango plantations is one of the major income sources of the region, with mangoes being exported to many neighbouring countries.
Dasheri Mango is very delicious and known for its sweetness and soft pulp.
Other varieties of mangoes such as Chausa, Fazli, Lucknowa, Jauhari, Safeda, etc. are also grown here.

Vegetables are another major export here.

In film and television
The Filmfare Award winner (1979) and winner of National Film Award for Best Feature Film in Hindi (1978), film Junoon was mostly shot in the Mahals of Malihabad. The 1978 Urdu film was produced by Shashi Kapoor and directed by Shyam Benegal and was a hit of its time. The film was based on Ruskin Bond novella A Flight of Pigeons. Other productions that have shot in Malihabad include the films Shorgul and Mulk and the television series Savdhaan India and Krishna Chali London.

Malihabad and its famous mangoes are mentioned several times in the 2004 film Lakshya.

Culture
Malihabad prides itself on Nawab Faqueer Mohammad Khan 'Goya', the poet and courtier of Awadh; "Shaayar-e-Inquilaab"Padma Bhushan Josh Malihabadi(born as Shabbir Hasan Khan), who later migrated to Pakistan after this. Abdur Razzaq Malihabadi, Abrar hasan khan Asar Malihabadi Writer and poet, Ahmad Saeed Malihabadi take place in poetry; Padma Shri Ghaus Mohammad Khan, the tennis player and Anwar Nadeem, stage artist, writer and poet. was born in Malihabad (India) in 1962. Abdullah Ramzi Khan hails from bakhtiyar nagar, Malihabad is a lawyer, author and a Historian. He is an authority on Malihabad and awadh History. He is the author of a memorable Travelogue in English language, ' The Known and the Unknown Monuments,places and persons of Awadh'(2019 vol 1,2020 vol 2),which was published by Royal Book Company. He is a first noted English writer from Malihabad. He has translated a book originally written by William Howe (1895) in English into the Hindi language. It has also produced some great Urdu writers like Mohsin Khan who possess a remarkable writing style. His Urdu play Khvab ki Ta'bir was awarded first prize in a radio-play contest drawing participants from nineteen Indian languages. after all we also remark some famous hindi writers and poet bhaskar malihabdi is one of Malihabadi Poet he Wrote Khand Kavya on Rani Durgavati Later, due to economic reasons, he had to go to Madhya Pradesh
Now in Malihabad our New inqlabi and loving poet and socialist writerArun malihabadi is nowadays popular with their quotes.

Villages 
Malihabad block contains the following 100 villages:

Notable people 
 Ghaus Mohammad Khan, sportsperson
 Josh Malihabadi, writer, revolutionary poet
 Kaleem Ullah Khan, Mango farmer
 Abdur Razzaq Malihabadi, journalist

References 

Cities and towns in Lucknow district